Erik Victor Van't Hof (born November 12, 1960) is a former professional tennis player from the United States.

Early life 
Van't Hof was born in the Dutch city of Rotterdam but grew up in Downey, California.

Education 
He was a four year scholarship athlete at Southern Methodist University (SMU). In 1983, Van't Hof graduated with a bachelor's degree in Business Administration.

Professional career 
Primarily a doubles specialist, Van't Hof partnered with Derek Tarr at the 1984 U.S. Clay Court Championships, where they made the quarter-finals by upsetting second seeds Pavel Složil and Ferdi Taygan. His best singles performance on tour came in 1984 when he made the second round of the Tokyo Outdoor Grand Prix event, with a win over Huub van Boeckel.

During his career he competed in the main draw of the men's doubles competitions at the Australian Open, Wimbledon Championships and US Open. At the 1985 Wimbledon Championships, Van't Hof teamed up with Brian Levine to make the third round.

Challenger circuit titles

References

External links 
 
 

1960 births
Living people
American male tennis players
SMU Mustangs men's tennis players
Tennis people from California
Sportspeople from Downey, California
Sportspeople from Rotterdam
American people of Dutch descent